The 2003 Finlandia Trophy is an annual senior-level international figure skating competition held in Finland. It was held in Helsinki on October 10–12, 2003. Skaters competed in the disciplines of men's singles, ladies' singles, pair skating, and ice dancing.

Results

Men

Ladies

Pairs

Ice dancing

External links
 2003 Finlandia Trophy results

Finlandia Trophy
Finlandia Trophy, 2003
Finlandia Trophy, 2003